St Michael's Church, Manafon, is in the small village of Manafon, Powys, Wales.  It is an active Anglican church in the parish of Llanfair Caereinion, Llanllugan and Manafon, the deanery of Mathrafal, the archdeaconry of Montgomery and the diocese of St Asaph.  The church has been designated by Cadw as a Grade II* listed building.

History

There is documentary evidence relating to the church in 1254 and 1291 but otherwise nothing is known of its history until it was restored in 1859.  In this restoration windows, including a five-light dormer window on the south side, were replaced and the vestry was added.  A further restoration was carried out by the Chester architect, John Douglas in 1898.  Plaster was removed from the walls and the chancel floor was raised.  Douglas replaced the seating, added a screen between the nave and chancel, provided a new pulpit, lectern, prayer desks, altar rails and table, sedilia and a credence table.  He also designed the lych gate at the entrance to the churchyard.  In 1992 repairs were undertaken to the interior of the west wall.  The poet R. S. Thomas was rector of Manafon from 1942 to 1954.

Architecture

The church is built in stone with slate roofs.  Its plan consists of a nave and chancel in a single chamber with a south porch, a north vestry and a timber belfry at the west end.  On the end of the east gable is a Celtic cross finial.  The east window is the original Perpendicular window.  The other windows date from the 1859 restoration.  The belfry is painted white, it has louvered bell-openings on the north and south faces, and a pyramidal slate roof surmounted by a weathercock.

External features

In the churchyard is a sundial set on a wooden plinth.  The lychgate is at the main, southwest entrance.  A slate hipped roof is supported by three tie-beams and has a central cross.  The middle tie-beam is inscribed in Welsh on the church side and in English on the side of the road.

See also
List of church restorations, amendments and furniture by John Douglas

References

External links
Artwork at St Michael's Church, Manafon

Churches in Powys
Church in Wales church buildings
English Gothic architecture in Powys
Gothic architecture in Wales
John Douglas buildings
Grade II* listed churches in Powys